13 Letters is the second compilation album by the Christian hip hop group 116 Clique. It charted at No. 29 on the Billboard Christian Albums chart and No. 10 on the Billboard Gospel Albums chart.

Track listing

References

116 (hip hop group) albums
2007 compilation albums
Reach Records albums